Nervilia holochila, commonly known as the ribbed shield orchid, is a small terrestrial orchid found in northern Australia. It has up to six pink, greenish or cream-coloured, short-lived flowers with a pink to mauve labellum. A dark green, egg-shaped leaf emerges at the base of the flowering stem after flowering.

Description
Nervilia holochila is a terrestrial, perennial, deciduous, sympodial herb which grows in colonies with only a few individuals producing flowers in any one year. The flowers only last for a few days, following which a single leaf develops, including on those plants that did not flower. Flowering occurs between November and December.

Taxonomy and naming
The ribbed shield orchid was first formally described in 1866 by Ferdinand von Mueller who gave it the namePogonia holochila and published the description in Fragmenta phytographiae Australiae.<ref name="Mueller">{{cite book |last1=von Mueller |first1=Ferdinand |title=Fragmenta phytographiae Australiae |date=1866 |volume=5 |location=Melbourne |pages=200–201 |url=https://www.biodiversitylibrary.org/item/7222#page/209/mode/1up |accessdate=18 August 2018}}</ref> In 1906 Rudolf Schlechter changed the name to Nervilia holochila. The specific epithet (holochila'') is derived from the ancient Greek words  meaning "whole" and  meaning "lip".

Distribution and habitat
The ribbed shield orchid occurs in the northern Kimberley region of Western Australia, northern parts of the Northern Territory, on the Cape York Peninsula as far south as Bowen and on some of the islands in the Torres Strait. It grows in forest, on rainforest margins and around swamps.

References 

holochila
Plants described in 1866
Orchids of Queensland
Orchids of the Northern Territory
Orchids of Western Australia
Taxa named by Ferdinand von Mueller